The Gotini (in Tacitus), who are generally equated to the Cotini in other sources, were a Gaulish tribe living during Roman times in the mountains approximately near the modern borders of the Czech Republic, Poland, and Slovakia.

The spelling "Gotini" is only known from one classical source, the De Origine et situ Germanorum of Tacitus. Tacitus clearly distinguishes the Gotini from the similarly named Gotones, whom he discusses in the immediately following passage.

Tacitus described the Gotini as speaking a Gaulish language and working, to their degradation, in mining. Like their neighbours in the mountains, the Osi, they had to pay tribute to both the neighbouring Quadi and Sarmatians. Although the Gotini lived in the midst of Suevic peoples, in geographical Germania, they were not Germanic in their language.

They probably lived in the area of modern western Slovakia, Moravia, and southern Poland. They may have constituted all or part of the archaeological Púchov culture, with its center in Púchov.

It has also been suggested that the same people are reported by Claudius Ptolemy as the Κῶγνοι. Ptolemy places them south of the Sidones, south of the Askiburgi mountains (probably the modern Sudeten mountains) but north of Hercynian valley. So as in Tacitus, they are situated near the Buri and north of the Quadi.

The tribe was apparently first mentioned in 10 BC in the so-called Elogium of Tusculum, an inscription from the time of Augustus found in Tusculum, south of Rome. It records how a legate of Illyricum entered relations of peace or war with the Cotini and Anarti.

The "Cotini" are later mentioned by Dio Cassius, negotiating with the Romans during the Marcomannic Wars. He reports that around 172 AD the Cotini offered to attack the Marcomanni in exchange for a grant of land, then ensured their own destruction by failing to uphold their end of the bargain.

It has been suggested that to punish them, Marcus Aurelius moved all or some of the Cotini to Lower Pannonia, which happened not later than 180 AD. Roman inscriptions of 223-251 AD mention a Pannonian people known as the "cives Cotini" - the Cotini people.

References

Bohemia
Gauls
Prehistory of the Czech lands
Ancient Slovakia
Historical Celtic peoples